Narain Dass Gupta is Member of Parliament Rajya Sabha from NCT of Delhi, practicing chartered accountant, and former president of the Institute of Chartered Accountants of India (ICAI). He is a financial policy expert who has written several books on taxation.

He is first Indian to be elected on the Board of International Federation of Accountants, U.S.A (a federation of 164 regulatory accounting bodies of 116 countries). He passed B.Com (H) from Shri Ram College of Commerce, Delhi and was awarded Outstanding Alumni Award for outstanding achievement in his sphere of activity thereby bringing honor to his alma mater which was given by the then Prime Minister of India, Sh. Atal Bihari Vajpayee on 30 November 2001. Thorough Philanthropic to his core sharing the nation's concerns over the victims of the devastating Gujarat Earthquake that had shaken the country in January, 2001, mobilized generous support and help from professional colleague, a modest contribution of Rs. 51 lakhs was handed over to then Prime Minister of India, towards Prime Minister's National Relief Fund. He has passed his CA examinations with distinction.

Biography
Narain Dass Gupta was the President of Institute of Chartered Accountants of India(2001–02). He was the candidate of the Aam Aadmi Party for the Rajya Sabha. On 8 January 2018 he was elected unopposed.

Early life
N D Gupta was born on 16 October 1945, the third of the seven children o Fimo Devi and Rameshwar Dass Gupta. His father Rameshwar Dass Gupta was Sarpanch of Village Guhna, Sonipat District of Haryana. His son CA Naveen N D Gupta has been president of ICAI.

References

1945 births
Living people
Aam Aadmi Party politicians from Delhi
21st-century Indian politicians
Rajya Sabha members from Delhi
Rajya Sabha members from Aam Aadmi Party